Nikola Mladenović (born 16 June 1992) is a Serbian-German footballer who plays for Hessenliga club Rot-Weiß Walldorf.

Career

Mladenović began his career with SV Darmstadt 98 and made his 3. Liga debut for the club in April 2012, as a substitute for Rudi Hübner in a 4–0 win over Werder Bremen II. In January 2014 he signed for SV Waldhof Mannheim.

External links

Nikola Mladenović at Fupa

1992 births
German people of Serbian descent
Living people
German footballers
Association football fullbacks
Association football midfielders
SV Darmstadt 98 players
SV Waldhof Mannheim players
SV Seligenporten players
SC Hessen Dreieich players
TSV Schott Mainz players
3. Liga players
Regionalliga players
Hessenliga players
Oberliga (football) players